Eugnosta willettana is a species of moth of the family Tortricidae. It is found in North America, where it has been recorded from southern California and southern Arizona, as well as Mexico.

The wingspan is 24–27 mm. Adults have been recorded on wing from January to February.

The larvae feed within galls found on Encelia farinosa. Full-grown larvae reach a length of about 12 mm.

Etymology
The species is named in honour of Dr. George Willett, curator of Entomology and Chair at the American Museum of Natural History.

References

Moths described in 1939
Eugnosta